20th CDG Awards
February 20, 2018

Contemporary: 
I, Tonya

Period: 
The Shape of Water

Sci-Fi/Fantasy: 
Wonder Woman
The 20th Costume Designers Guild Awards, honoring the best costume designs in film and television for 2017, took place on February 20, 2018. The nominees were announced on January 10, 2018.

Winners and nominees

Film

Excellence in Contemporary Film
 I, Tonya — Jennifer Johnson
 Get Out — Nadine Haders
 Kingsman: The Golden Circle — Arianne Phillips
 Lady Bird — April Napier
 Three Billboards Outside Ebbing, Missouri — Melissa Toth

Excellence in Period Film
 The Shape of Water — Luis Sequeira Dunkirk — Jeffrey Kurland
 The Greatest Showman — Ellen Mirojnick
 Murder on the Orient Express — Alexandra Byrne
 Phantom Thread — Mark Bridges

Excellence in Sci-Fi/Fantasy Film
 Wonder Woman — Lindy Hemming Beauty and the Beast — Jacqueline Durran
 Blade Runner 2049 — Renée April
 Star Wars: The Last Jedi — Michael Kaplan
 Thor: Ragnarok — Mayes C. Rubeo

Television

Excellence in Contemporary Television
 The Handmaid's Tale — Ane Crabtree American Horror Story: Cult — Sarah Evelyn Bram
 Big Little Lies — Alix Friedberg
 Grace and Frankie — Allyson B. Fanger
 The Young Pope — Luca Canfora and Carlo Poggioli

Excellence in Period Television
 The Crown — Jane Petrie Feud: Bette and Joan — Lou Eyrich
 GLOW — Beth Morgan
 The Marvelous Mrs. Maisel — Donna Zakowska
 Stranger Things — Kim Wilcox

Excellence in Sci-Fi/Fantasy Television
 Game of Thrones'' — Michele Clapton
 Black Mirror: USS Callister — Maja Meschede
 Once Upon a Time — Eduardo Castro and Dan Lester
 Sleepy Hollow — Mairi Chisholm
 Star Trek: Discovery — Gersha Phillips

Short Form

Excellence in Short Film Design
 P!nk: "Beautiful Trauma" Music Video — Kim Bowen
 Assassin's Creed: "I Am" Commercial — Patrik Milani
 Elton John feat. Marilyn Manson: "Tiny Dancer" Music Video — Sara Sensoy and Dawn Ritz
 Katy Perry: "Chained to the Rhythm" Music Video — B. Ăkerlund
 Miu Miu: Women's Tales #14: The End of History Illusion'' — Mindy Le Brock

Career Achievement Award
Joanna Johnston

Spotlight Award
Kerry Washington

Distinguished Collaborator Award
Guillermo del Toro

Hall of Fame
John Mollo

Distinguished Service Award
Maggie Schpak

References

Costume Designers Guild Awards
2018 film awards
2018 television awards
2017 guild awards
2017 in fashion
2017 in American cinema
2017 in American television